Marburg-Biedenkopf is a Kreis (district) in the west of Hesse, Germany. Neighboring districts are Waldeck-Frankenberg, Schwalm-Eder, Vogelsbergkreis, Gießen, Lahn-Dill, Siegen-Wittgenstein.

History 
The district was created in 1974 when the districts Marburg, Biedenkopf and the former urban district of Marburg were merged.

The district has partnerships with Huntingdonshire in the United Kingdom, the borough of Charlottenburg in Berlin, and the district of Kościerzyna in Poland.

Geography 
The main river in the district is the Lahn.

Coat of arms 
The coat of arms shows the lion of Hesse, as Marburg was the seat of the landgraves of Hesse, and also their tomb is located in a church in Marburg. The coat held by the lion shows the black cross of the Counts of the Teutonic Knights, who had a castle in Marburg as well.

Towns and municipalities

References

External links 

 Official website 
 Tourism in Marburg-Biedenkopf 

 
Districts of Hesse